Joan de Munchensi or Munchensy (or Joanna), Lady of Swanscombe and Countess of Pembroke (c. 1230 – aft. 20 September 1307), was the daughter of Joan Marshal and granddaughter of William Marshal, 1st Earl of Pembroke and Isabel de Clare, 4th Countess of Pembroke suo jure.

Family
William Marshal was the great Lord Marshal who served five successive Kings of England and died in 1219. William's five sons each in turn became Earl of Pembroke, but all died childless. His inheritance was thus divided among his daughters. Joan Marshal, the fourth daughter, married Warin de Munchensi (or Munchensy), Lord of Swanscombe. They were survived by one daughter, Joan de Munchensi, who (owing to Joan Marshal's death soon after her daughter's birth) was brought up by her stepmother, Warin's second wife, Dionisie de Munchensi.

Marriage and children
In 1247, three sons of Hugh X of Lusignan, in difficulties after the French annexation of their territories, accepted Henry III's invitation to come to England. The three were William of Valence, Guy of Lusignan and Aymer. The king found important positions for all of them and William was soon married to Joan. Her portion of the Marshal estates included the castle and lordship of Pembroke and the lordship of Wexford in Ireland. The custody of Joan's property was entrusted to her husband. She also, apparently, transmitted to him the title of Earl of Pembroke; he thus became the first of the de Valence holders of the earldom.

Like many women of property in the Middle Ages, Joan was prepared to assert her rights through litigation, especially after her husband's death left her without a male figure to act for her. In 1304 she was in Court over her right to the lordship of Wexford, and she appealed to King Edward I personally to intervene after she received an unfavourable judgement. The King upheld her appeal and ordered the Court of Common Pleas (Ireland) to put her in possession of the lordship.

William of Valence died in 1296. Accounts of the offspring of William and Joan vary, but all say that there were five children, others seven including the last two: 
 Isabel de Valence (d. 5 October 1305), married before 1280 John Hastings, 1st Baron Hastings (6 May 1262 – 10 February 1313). Their grandson Lawrence later became earl of Pembroke. They had:
 William Hastings (1282 – 1311)
 John Hastings, 2nd Baron Hastings (29 September 1286 – 20 January 1325), married to Juliane de Leybourne (d. 1367)
 Sir Hugh Hastings of Sutton (d. 1347)
 Joan de Valence, married to John Comyn (the "Red Comyn"), Lord of Badenoch (d. murdered, 10 February 1306), and had
 Elizabeth de Comyn (1 November 1299 – 20 November 1372), married to Richard Talbot, 2nd Baron Talbot
 John de Valence (d. January 1277)
 William de Valence (d. in battle in Wales on 16 June 1282), created Seigneur de Montignac and Bellac
 Aymer de Valence, 2nd Earl of Pembroke and Wexford in 1296 (c. 1270 – 23 June 1324), married firstly to Beatrice de Clermont and married secondly to Marie de Châtillon
 Margaret de Valence
Agnes de Valence (b. about 1250), married:
 August 1266, Kenilworth, Warwickshire Maurice Roe FitzGerald ( d. Jul 1268)
 c.1269 Hugh de Balliol ( d. 1271)
 c.1277 John d'Avesnes, Lord of Beaumont

References
Linda E. Mitchell, Joan de Valence: The Life and Influence of a Thirteenth-Century Noblewoman. Springer, 2016.

13th-century births
1307 deaths
Anglo-Normans in Wales
13th-century Welsh women
13th-century Welsh nobility
14th-century Welsh nobility
Anglo-Norman women
14th-century Welsh women
People from Swanscombe
Daughters of British earls
Pembroke